Eucalyptus wetarensis is a species of tree that is endemic to Wetar Island in Indonesia. It has rough, fibrous bark on the trunk and larger branches, lance-shaped or curved adult leaves, flower buds in groups of seven and bell-shaped to barrel-shaped fruit.

Description

Taxonomy and naming
Eucalyptus wetarensis was first formally described in 1995 by Lindsay Pryor from specimens collected near Carbubu Village on Wetar Island and the description was published in Australian Systematic Botany. It is similar to E. urophylla but has narrower leaves, shorter opercula and larger fruit.

Distribution
This eucalypt is one of only four species only occurring outside Australia. It is only known from Wetar island, one of the Lesser Sunda Islands of Indonesia.

References

wetarensis
Plants described in 1995
Endemic flora of the Maluku Islands